Bendy Casimir (born June 10, 1980) is a French professional Lightweight mixed martial artist. He has competed for the WEC and M-1 Global.

WEC career
He made his WEC debut against Ricardo Lamas on March 6, 2010 at WEC 47, losing via first-round knockout.

Casimir then faced Erik Koch on June 20, 2010 at WEC 49. He lost the fight via submission (triangle choke) in the first round.

Mixed martial arts record

|-
| Win
| align=center| 21–15–2
| Noah Ali
| Submission (heel hook)
| RITC 55
| 
| align=center| 1
| align=center| 1:24
| Lethbridge, Alberta, Canada
| 
|-
| Loss
| align=center| 20–15–2
| Manny Bermudez
| Submission (triangle choke)
| Cage Titans 35
| 
| align=center| 1
| align=center| 1:12
| Plymouth, Massachusetts, United States
| 
|-
| Loss
| align=center| 20–14–2
| Josh Hill
| Decision (unanimous)
| Z Promotions Fight Night 2
| 
| align=center| 3
| align=center| 5:00
| Medicine Hat, Alberta, Canada
| 
|-
| Loss
| align=center| 20–13–2
| Chris Gutiérrez
| Decision (unanimous)
| SCS 27: Survival
| 
| align=center| 5
| align=center| 5:00
| Hinton, Oklahoma, United States
| 
|-
| Loss
| align=center| 20–12–2
| Jesse Brock
| Decision (unanimous)
| FSF: Front Street Fights 5
| 
| align=center| 3
| align=center| 5:00
| Boise, Idaho, United States
|
|-
| Win
| align=center| 20–11–2
| Curtis Demarce
| KO (spinning back fist)
| HKFC: School of Hard Knocks 41
| 
| align=center| 2
| align=center| 0:40
| Calgary, Alberta, Canada
|
|-
| Loss
| align=center| 19–11–2
| Erinaldo dos Santos Rodrigues
| Decision (unanimous)
| XVT 5: Franca vs. Kheder
| 
| align=center| 3
| align=center| 5:00
| Cartago, Costa Rica
| 
|-
| Loss
| align=center| 19–10–2
| Rafaello Oliveira
| Decision (unanimous)
| Recife FC 3
| 
| align=center| 3
| align=center| 5:00
| Recife, Brazil
| 
|-
| Loss
| align=center| 19–9–2
| Julio Cesar de Almeida
| Decision (unanimous)
| Panama FC 1: War of Wars
| 
| align=center| 3
| align=center| 5:00
| Panama City, Panama
| 
|-
| Loss
| align=center| 19–8–2
| John Makdessi
| Decision (unanimous)
| MFL 3: Mixed Fight League
| 
| align=center| 3
| align=center| 5:00
| Montreal, Quebec, Canada
| 
|-
| Loss
| align=center| 19–7–2
| Erik Koch
| Submission (triangle choke)
| WEC 49
| 
| align=center| 1
| align=center| 3:01
| Edmonton, Alberta, Canada
| Featherweight bout
|-
| Loss
| align=center| 19–6–2
| Ricardo Lamas
| KO (knee)
| WEC 47
| 
| align=center| 1
| align=center| 3:43
| Columbus, Ohio, United States
| 
|-
| Win
| align=center| 19–5–2
| Maratbek Kalabekov
| Decision (unanimous)
| ProFC: Russia vs. Europe
| 
| align=center| 3
| align=center| 5:00
| Rostov-on-Don, Russia
| 
|-
| Win
| align=center| 18–5–2
| Niko Puhakka
| Submission (guillotine choke)  
| Fight Festival 25
| 
| align=center| 2
| align=center| 1:35 
| Helsinki, Finland
| 
|-
| Win
| align=center| 17–5–2
| Samuel Judes
| TKO (punches)
| Shooto: The Rookie Tournament 2008 Final
| 
| align=center| 1
| align=center| 4:42
| Dinant, Belgium
| 
|-
| Loss
| align=center| 16–5–2
| Takashi Nakakura
| Submission (rear naked choke)
| Shooto: Shooto Tradition 4
| 
| align=center| 1
| align=center| 4:58
| Tokyo, Japan
| 
|-
| Win
| align=center| 16–4–2
| Vaclav Pribyl
| Submission (armbar)
| Hell Cage 2
| 
| align=center| 1
| align=center| 3:54
| Prague, Czech Republic
| 
|-
| Win
| align=center| 15–4–2
| Anton Kuivanen
| Submission (kneebar) 
| Hell Cage 2
| 
| align=center| 1
| align=center| 4:03 
| Prague, Czech Republic
| 
|-
| Win
| align=center| 14–4–2
| Shinji Sasaki
| Decision (unanimous) 
| Shooto: Shooto Tradition 1
| 
| align=center| 2
| align=center| 5:00
| Tokyo, Japan
| 
|-
| Win
| align=center| 13–4–2
| Andre Winner
| Decision (majority) 
| Cage Warriors: Enter the Rough House 6
| 
| align=center| 3
| align=center| 5:00
| Nottingham, England
| 
|-
| Win
| align=center| 12–4–2
| Mikhail Malyutin
| Decision (split)
| M-1 Challenge 2: Russia
| 
| align=center| 2
| align=center| 5:00
| Saint Petersburg, Russia
| 
|-
| Win
| align=center| 11–4–2
| Mikhail Malyutin
| Decision (split)
| M-1: Slamm
| 
| align=center| 3
| align=center| 5:00
| Amsterdam, Netherlands
| 
|-
| Win
| align=center| 10–4–2
| Mike Duncan
| Submission (kneebar)
| Shooto Belgium IV: Encounter the Braves 
| 
| align=center| 3
| align=center| 0:10
| Charleroi, Belgium
| 
|-
| Draw
| align=center| 9–4–2
| Amir Shankhalov
| Draw 
| M-1 Global: International Mix
| 
| align=center| 3
| align=center| 5:00
| Saint Petersburg, Russia
| 
|-
| Win
| align=center| 9–4–1
| Daniel Thomas
| Submission (guillotine choke)  
| Cage Rage Contenders: Dynamite
| 
| align=center| 1
| align=center| 3:19 
| Dublin, Ireland
| 
|-
| Win
| align=center| 8–4–1
| Chris Stringer
| Submission (guillotine choke)
| Cage Wars 7: Scotland the Brave
| 
| align=center| 1
| align=center| 2:16
| Glasgow, Scotland
| 
|-
| Win
| align=center| 7–4–1
| Peter Duncan
| Submission (guillotine choke)
| Cage Wars 6: Battle in Belfast
| 
| align=center| 1
| align=center| 1:00
| Belfast, Northern Ireland
| 
|-
| Win
| align=center| 6–4–1
| Seydina Seck
| Submission (kneebar)
| Xtreme Gladiators 3
| 
| align=center| 1
| align=center| 2:09
| Paris, France
| 
|-
| Win
| align=center| 5–4–1
| Vincent Latoel
| Submission (kimura)
| Shooto Belgium: Consecration 
| 
| align=center| 1
| align=center| 4:02
| Charleroi, Belgium
| 
|-
| Loss
| align=center| 4–4–1
| Yuri Ivlev
| Submission (armbar) 
| Hell Cage 2
| 
| align=center| 1
| align=center| 4:54 
| Saint Petersburg, Russia
| 
|-
| Loss
| align=center| 4–3–1
| Thomas Hytten
| TKO 
| European Vale Tudo 5: "Phoenix": The European Grand Prix 2005 
| 
| align=center| 1
| align=center| 4:35
| Stockholm, Sweden
| 
|-
| Win
| align=center| 4–2–1
| Dave Swann
| Submission (arm triangle) 
| CWFC: Strike Force
| 
| align=center| 1
| align=center| 4:07
| Coventry, England
| 
|-
| Draw
| align=center| 3–2–1
| Tom Niinimäki
| Draw
| G-Shooto: G-Shooto 02
| 
| align=center| 2
| align=center| 5:00
| Stockholm, Sweden
| 
|-
| Win
| align=center| 3–2
| Michal Hamrsmid
| TKO
| Night of the Gladiators 
| 
| align=center| 1
| 
| Prague, Czech Republic
| 
|-
| Win
| align=center| 2–2
| Petr Mai
| Submission (kneebar)
| Night of the Gladiators 
| 
| align=center| 1
| 
| Prague, Czech Republic
| 
|-
| Win
| align=center| 1–2
| Philly San
| TKO (punches) 
| UK MMA Championships 6: Extreme Warriors 
| 
| align=center| 1
| align=center| 0:45
| Essex, England
| 
|-
| Loss
| align=center| 0–2
| Robbie Olivier
| Submission (choke) 
| UK MMA Championships 4: Battle of Britain 
| 
| align=center| 1
| 
| Essex, England
| 
|-
| Loss
| align=center| 0–1
| Leigh Remedios
| Submission (strikes) 
| Millennium Brawl 4: The Battle of Trafalgar 
| 
| align=center| 3
| 
| Buckinghamshire, England
|

References

External links 

1980 births
French mixed martial artists of Black African descent
Featherweight mixed martial artists
Lightweight mixed martial artists
Sportspeople from Val-de-Marne
Living people
People from Alfortville